Blenz Coffee (officially Blenz The Canadian Coffee Company) is a Canadian franchise chain of coffee shops. The first shop was opened in Vancouver, British Columbia in 1992. The chain has since grown to include a network of franchised locations, 64 in British Columbia Canada.

See also
Coffee house
List of coffeehouse chains

References

External links
Official website

Coffeehouses and cafés in Canada
Food and drink companies based in Vancouver
Canadian companies established in 1992
Restaurants established in 1992
Retail companies established in 1992
1992 establishments in British Columbia